A.O. Ypato Football Club is a Greek football club based in Ypato, Boeotia, Greece.

Honours

Domestic

 Boeotia FCA Champions: 1
 2017–18
  Boeotia FCA Second Division Champions: 3
 2004–05, 2013–14, 2015–16
 Boeotia FCA Cup Winners: 2
 2018–19, 2021–22
 Boeotia FCA Super Cup Winners: 3
 2018, 2019, 2022

Players

Current squad

References

Football clubs in Central Greece
Boeotia
Association football clubs established in 1976
1976 establishments in Greece
Gamma Ethniki clubs